Volha is a comedy-drama television series directed by Jan Pachl. It is based on a book by Karel Hynie called Volha – záznam o provozu motorového vozidla.

Plot
Communist Czechoslovakia in 1971. Standa Pekárek finishes his compulsory military service and becomed a chauffeur at Czechoslovak television. He dreams about getting his own Volha, driving for the humor and folk entertainment editorial office and driving Karel Gott. He is willing to do anything to fulfill his dream and thus he agrees to collaborate with State Security under codename Volha.

Cast
 Kryštof Hádek as Standa Pekárek
 Klára Melíšková as Mother Pekárková
 Tomáš Jeřábek as producer Pepa Horáček
 Aňa Geislerová as Director Vlasta Válová
 Stanislav Majer as Cinematographer Zikmund
 Aneta Krejčíková as Secretary Květa
 Lukáš Příkazký as Editor Zajíček
 Bohumil Klepl as Director Truhlář
 Jiří Dvořák as StB operative Labský
 Přemysl Bureš as StB operative Šlégr
 Robert Mikluš as Pavel Landovský
 Vanda Hybnerová as Jungmanová
 Jiří Lábus as Míla Vyhnálek
 Martin Pechlát as Comrade Brabec

Episodes

External links
Website (in Czech)
CSFD.cz

References 

Czech comedy television series
Czech drama television series
2023 Czech television series debuts
Czech Television original programming